The Ida May is a Chesapeake Bay skipjack, built in 1906 at Urbanna or Deep Creek, Virginia. She is one of the 35 surviving traditional Chesapeake Bay skipjacks and a member of the last commercial sailing fleet in the United States. She is located at Chance, Somerset County, Maryland.

She was listed on the National Register of Historic Places in 1985. She is assigned Maryland dredge number 41.

References

External links
Blog of Gladden Family's Reconstruction of Historic Skipjack Ida May
, including photo in 1983, at Maryland Historical Trust

Somerset County, Maryland
Skipjacks
Ships on the National Register of Historic Places in Maryland
1906 ships
National Register of Historic Places in Somerset County, Maryland